René Seyssaud (16 June 1867 – 26 September 1952) was a Provençal painter and is known as a precursor of Fauvism.

Biography 
Seyssaud was born on 16 June 1867 in Marseille, but spent his childhood at his ancestral home of Pezet house (Villes-sur-Auzon). He came from a Vaucluse family, his father (Siffrein Seyssaud) being a lawyer.

Noted for his powerful temperament and his bold, brightly coloured palette, Seyssaud together with Louis Valtat has been described as a precursor of Fauvism. His first major exhibition was at the Salon des Indépendants in Paris in 1892. He then opened the Salon d'Automne and the Salon des Tuileries.

His marriage on 11 January 1899 to Louise Philibert gave him the opportunity to settle in Villes-sur-Auzon, where he chose Mont Ventoux and the gorges of the Nesque as his pictorial themes. On 27 April 1901, François Thiébault-Sisson wrote in Le Temps about Seyssaud:

Suffering from tuberculosis, his doctors advised Seyssaud to move closer to the sea and in 1904 he moved to Saint-Chamas, where his studio overlooked the Étang de Berre. He lived there until his death. Still, Seyssaud often came back to the foot of the Ventoux and in the mid-1930s, he set up a studio in Aurel. His cousins Jean, the twins Paul and Philippe, came there to meet him and, following his example, took up painting and made a name for themselves.

Seyssaud died in Saint-Chamas on 26 September 1952.

Work 

Seyssaud is best known for his still lifes, his landscapes and the display of peasant life. His work was especially inspired by the Provençal landscape. In the Provence, the village of Villes-sur-Auzon, a Vaucluse village, and Saint-Chamas, near the Etang de Berre, were his main sources of inspiration.

 Musée d'Orsay
 Les Oliviers''', oil on canvas, 100.0 x 81.3 cm, 1898
 Musée des Beaux-Arts de Dijon:
 Portrait d'enfant, oil on canvas, 45 x 36,5 cm, 1890.
 Raisins et figues, oil on canvas, vers 1909.
 
 Paysans au travail, oil on canvas, 81 × 59 cm, non datée
 L’Etang de Berre Hermitage Museum, Saint Petersburg
 La Route'', oil on canvas, 32 x 49,3 cm, 1901

Recognition 
 1946: Officer of the Legion of Honour
 1952: Grand Prix d'Honneur des Provinces Francaises at the Menton Biennale

Exhibitions 
  (""): 30 April 2022 – 2 October 2022
 Musée des beaux Arts de Nîmes (""): 15 July 2020 – 17 January 2021
  (""): 14 July 2012 – 18 November 2012
 Musée de Région Auguste Chabaud, Graveson: 14 April 2012 – 1 July 2012
 Chapelle Saint-Pierre, Saint Chamas (""): 7 June 2008 – 29 July 2008
 , Martigues (""): 5 November 2003 – 28 January 2004

References

Further reading

External links 

 

20th-century French painters
1867 births
1952 deaths
Recipients of the Legion of Honour